Justin Bruening (born September 24, 1979) is an American actor and former fashion model. He was originally discovered at McDonald's in Escondido, California, by Sue Nessel, a scout for Scott Copeland. Within a week, he was shooting photos with Bruce Weber. In 2003, his acting career began when he was cast in the role of Jamie Martin on the daytime drama All My Children, earning him a Soap Opera Digest Award in 2005 for the portrayal. In late 2007, not long after leaving the role, Bruening was cast as Mike Traceur, the son of character Michael Knight, a new take on the original Knight Rider series. In 2011, he was cast as Tyler Berrett, a recurring role on The CW series Ringer starring Sarah Michelle Gellar and in 2013, he joined Ravenswood.

Early life
Justin Bruening was born on September 24, 1979 in St. Helena, Nebraska.

Career
Following graduation, Bruening moved to San Diego, California. It was there that he was discovered by Sue Nessel, a talent scout for Scott Copeland International, at McDonald's in Escondido just north of San Diego. Soon afterwards, Copeland got him his first modeling job for Abercrombie & Fitch.

Following his first commercial job, Bruening was encouraged to study acting by Copeland and was noticed by All My Children casting director Judy Wilson. Bruening originally auditioned for the role of JR Chandler on All My Children, but was eventually cast in the role of James "Jamie" Martin in July 2003. For a brief time, in 2004 and 2005, Bruening also portrayed Jamie Martin on One Life to Live during a crossover storyline. During his role of Jamie, Bruening was featured as Daytime's Hottest Star in Teen People, Us Weekly, Star and J-14 magazines.

In addition to his work on soap operas, he has had a guest appearance on Hope & Faith and a small part in the film Fat Girls. He was up for the role of Superman in Superman Returns, but the part was won by Brandon Routh instead. He also appeared in the Britney Spears music video "Boys". On October 21, 2007 he appeared on CBS's Cold Case, in the episode "Thick As Thieves".

On November 2, 2007, it was announced that Bruening would be starring in a new rendition of the original Knight Rider series, portraying the original Knight Rider's son, Mike Traceur, for a two-hour film on NBC. NBC decided after successful ratings for the film to continue the story as a series, and commissioned an official series for its debut for the 2008–2009 television season.

In 2011, Bruening began a recurring role on the CW mystery series, Ringer. In 2012, he began a recurring role on the ABC family drama, Switched at Birth. In 2013, he had a recurring role on the ABC drama, Grey's Anatomy as Paramedic Matt. He then featured in the limited season run of the Pretty Little Liars''' spin-off Ravenswood in 2013. In 2018, he was cast as 'Nash' the co-star of the Hallmark Channel tv movie Last Vermont Christmas.

Personal life
Bruening proposed to former All My Children co-star Alexa Havins on the set of the soap opera. They were married on June 5, 2005. The two were friends first before becoming romantically involved.  After Bruening left All My Children'', Havins exited shortly after and the couple moved to Los Angeles. On August 10, 2010, he and Havins welcomed their first child, daughter Lexington Grace Bruening. Justin and Alexa Havins have two more children.

Filmography

Film

Television

Awards and nominations

References

External links

1979 births
21st-century American male actors
Living people
Male models from Nebraska
American male soap opera actors
American male television actors
Male actors from Nebraska
People from Chadron, Nebraska